Shah Nawaz Khan
came to serve to represent Ghazni Province in Afghanistan's Meshrano Jirga, the upper house of its National Legislature, in 2005.
He is a member of the Pashtun ethnic group.

References

Members of the House of Elders (Afghanistan)
Living people
Year of birth missing (living people)